Mountain Sounds Festival is an annual over 18's boutique music festival that is held in Central Coast (New South Wales), Australia. The first festival was held on Saturday March 15, 2014.

Lineups year by year
As listed on the official website.

2014

 Ball Park Music 
 Beni
 Canyons (DJ Set)
 Cosmo's Midnight
 Emma Louise
 The Holidays
 Jinja Safari
 LDRU
 Midnight Juggernauts (DJ Set)
 Snakadaktal
 Softwar
 Sticky Fingers (band)
 Wordlife (live)
 Yacht Club DJs
 Yolanda Be Cool
 World’s End Press
 SOSUEME DJs
 Sea Legs
 Tropical Zombie
 The Lazys
 Buzz Kull
 Roof
 Elliot The Bull
 Thieves
 Slow Blow
 Parkside

2015 
 
 Alison Wonderland
 Touch Sensitive
 Carmada
 D.D Dumbo
 DZ Deathrays
 The Griswolds
 E^ST
 Winterbourne
 Odd Mob
 Little Earthquake
 Acaddamy
 PH Fat
 Nova & the Experience
 Dr Kong & the Stem Cells
 AViVAA
 Owen Rabbit
 Colour Cage
 White Walkers
 Rookie
 Via Alchemy
 East of Here
 Coda
 Daniel Lee Kendall
 Harper
 Hatch
 The Jungle Giants
 Kilter
 Lemond
 The Kite String Tangle
 Luke Million
 Northeast Party House
 Pepa Knight
 Ratlife DJs
 Safia (band)
 Stephane 1993
 Sydney Social DJs
 Tkay Maidza
 Tropical Zombie
 Zavier

2016

 Albert Hammond Jr. (USA)
 Alpine (band)
 Art Vs Science
 Cut Snake (band)
 The Delta Riggs
 Green Buzzard
 Harts
 Hockey Dad
 Holy Holy
 I Know Leopard
 Jack Beats (UK)
 The Jezabels
 The Lazys
 Motez (producer)
 Nina Las Vegas
 Ocean Alley 
 Odd Mob
 Sea Legs
 Set Mo
 Skegss
 Slumberjack
 Tropical Zombie
 World Champion
 Violent Soho

plus:
 Bass RQ
 Bodega Collective
 Catalyst
 Elwood Myre
 Goonz
 Ivy
 J-Ray
 Jaket
 Jimmi Walker
 Man To Moon
 The Moving Stills
 Paperfox
 Pear
 Peekay
 Roof
 Savilian
 SnilluM
 Stay Sane
 The Sea Gypsies
 Tom Hogan
 Twin Caverns
 Voyage IV

2017

 RÜFÜS
 Hermitude
 DMA's
 Dune Rats
 Ngaiire
 Skegss
 Mosquito Coast (band)
 The Gooch Palms
 Bec Sandridge
 Poolclvb
 These New South Whales
 The Ruminaters
 Tropical Zombie
 Rackett
 Betty & Oswald
 Stay At Home Mum
 Voyage IV
 Raave Tapes
 Catayst
 Sammi Constantine
 The Moving Stills
 Elaskia
 Vacations
 Geords
 Man To Moon
 Hayden Shepherd
 Joel & Leroy
 Bodega Collective
 Nelipot
 David Bangma
 Soy
 Strange Associates
 Lunar DJs
 Cabal DJs
 TillDawn
 Seany P
 Stoive
 Samuel Kirk
 BBQ Baz
 J-Ray
 Terminus43
 Steve Pike
 Bass RQ
 Bad Decisions

Magic Mountain Party Lineup

 Torren Foot
 Nicky Night Time
 Motorik Vibe Council
 Commandeur (Drummer) (DJ set)
 Barney Cools DJs
 Bare Essentials DJs
 Kinder (band) DJs
 Cabal DJs
 Lunar DJs

2018

 Peking Duk
 Alex The Astronaut
 Ali Barter
 Amy Shark
 The Creases
 Fisher
 Gang Of Youths
 GL
 Grouplove (USA)
 Hayden James
 Hockey Dad
 Hot Dub Time Machine
 Kirin J. Callinan
 Motez (producer)
 Nathan Barato (CAN)
 Paces (musician)
 Safia (band)
 Touch Sensitive
 The Preatures
 Barney Cools DJs
 Bard
 Bass-RQ
 Baz
 Bean Dip
 Bodega Collective
 Cabal DJs
 Cassette
 Charles
 Chymes
 Classica
 Club Raiders DJs
 Conspiracy Crew
 Cosmic Ken
 Cpt Rhys
 David Bangma
 Desiki Dominique
 Elaskia
 Elijah Something
 Eluera
 Exhibitionist
 Fripps & Fripps
 Geords
 Gibson Brothers
 Hannah
 Hayden Shepherd
 Ivy
 Jimmi Walker
 Jimmy 2 Sox B2B Tim Fuchs
 Joel Leggett
 Joseph Raymond & Louis Stenmark
 Kurt King

 Little Quirks

Los Scallywaggs

LTPD DJs

Luca Cavallaro

Mason Clarke

Moondogs

Nelipot

 Ninajirachi

Not Eve

Oh?

Peekay

Persian Rug

Pist Idiots

PITD

Rachel Maria Cox

Raave Tapes

Sam Kirk

Sammi Constantine

Seany P

Sequel

Soy

Steamboat Hollow

Steve Pike

Stoive

The Jim Mitchells

The Moving Stills

The Sea Gypsies

 Tia Gostelow

Tilldawn

Triple j unearthed winner

Tropical Zombie

Vena Klymo

Wales

Waxfinz

Will Collard & Josh Gapes

2019

References

Rock festivals in Australia
Music festivals established in 2014
Electronic music festivals in Australia
2014 establishments in Australia
Central Coast (New South Wales)